A suicide bombing occurred on November 21, 2002 in a public bus in the neighborhood of Kiryat Menachem in  Jerusalem. 11 people were killed in the attack and over 50 were injured.

The Palestinian Islamist militant organization Hamas claimed responsibility for the attack.

The attack 
On November 21, 2002, at around 7:00 am,  Palestinian suicide bomber Na'el Abu Hilail, wearing an explosives belt packed with five-kilograms of explosives and shrapnel, boarded the public bus on Mexico Street in Jerusalem.

The suicide bomber detonated the explosives in the crowded bus, before the bus reached the next stop, while the bus was in the suburban neighborhood of Kiryat Menachem. 11 people were killed in the attack and over 50 were injured.

The perpetrators
Hamas took credit for the attack, which was carried out by Na'el Abu Hilail, 22, from el-Khader, just south of Bethlehem. Four of the victims were children on their way to school. Abu Hilail's father said he was pleased with his son, saying "Our religion says we are proud of him until the day of resurrection." His friends said he was a supporter of Islamic Jihad.

See also
Civilian casualties in the Second Intifada
Israeli casualties of war

References

External links 
 Bomb in Crowded Commuter Bus in Jerusalem Kills at Least 10 – The Washington Post, November 21, 2002
 Jerusalem suicide bombing kills 11 – The Guardian, November 21, 2002
 4 Children Are Among Dead In Jerusalem Bus Bombing – published on the Milwaukee Journal Sentinel, November 22, 2002
 Jerusalem bus blast kills 11 – published on BBC News, November 21, 2002
 Suicide bomber kills 11 in Jerusalem  – published on The Sun, November 22, 2002
 Bus Bomb Attack Kills 11 / Jerusalem blast injures 50; Sharon considering retaliation  – published on Newsday, November 22, 2002
 Suicide bombing of No. 20 Egged bus in Kiryat Menahem, Jerusalem,  November 21, 2002 – Israeli Ministry of Foreign Affairs

Mass murder in 2002
Suicide bombings in 2002
Israeli casualties in the Second Intifada
Terrorist incidents in Jerusalem
Hamas suicide bombings of buses
2002 in Jerusalem
November 2002 events in Asia
Terrorist incidents in Jerusalem in the 2000s
Islamic terrorism in Israel